Retirement Funds Administrators (abbreviated AFORE) are companies authorized to manage individual retirement accounts as authorized by the Ministry of Finance and Public Credit of Mexico and overseen by Comisión Nacional del Sistema de Ahorro para el Retiro 
(CONSAR). 

AFORES manage accounts that accumulate contributions by the employer, the federal government and the employee.

Accounts
Individual retirement accounts contain four separate sub-accounts which are:
Retirement, lay-off and old age (RCV, "Retiro, Cesantía y Vejez" in Spanish). This sub-account contains funds contributed by the employer, federal government and employee. 
The employer contributes with an equivalent to 2% of the employee's salary to retirement and 3.15% of the salary to the lay-off and old age account. Contributions take place bimonthly.
The government contributes 0.225% of the salary to the lay-off and old age account bimonthly and an equivalent of 5.5% of minimum wage in the Federal District.
The employee contributes with 1.125% of the salary bimonthly.
Voluntary contributions. An employee may also contribute extra funds voluntarily. Additional contributions may be done directly with the Afore or automatically deducted from the employee's salary.
Housing. This is a sub-account into which employers contribute an equivalent of five percent of the employee's salary. Funds are deposited with the INFONAVIT through the Fondo Nacional de la Vivienda ("National Housing Fund") and the Afore only registers contributions and balances. 
Complementary contributions. This sub-account will contain additional funds contributed by the employer or the employee to increase the pension balance. These funds can only be withdrawn after retirement.

Withdrawals
Withdrawals of funds from these accounts is possible under certain situations such as:
Old age. Funds can be withdrawn on or after reaching the age of 65.
Layoffs. A maximum of 10% of the funds can be withdrawn on or after the day 46 of being unemployed. This option can be exercised every five years.
Marriage. A maximum of 30 days of minimum wage in the Federal District can be withdrawn for wedding expenses.
Home purchase. The funds in the housing sub-account can be withdrawn to buy a house. If these funds are not used before retirement they can be withdrawn then.
Death
Accidents and illnesses leading to disability

See also
Mexico Pension Plan

External links
 AFORES  at the National Commission for the Protection and Defense of the Users of Financial Services (Spanish: "Comisión Nacional para la Protección y Defensa de los Usuarios de Servicios Financieros", abbreviated "Condusef").

Retirement
Financial services companies of Mexico